Union Township is one of twelve townships in Adams County, Iowa, USA.  At the 2010 census, its population was 144.

Geography
According to the USGS, it contains one cemetery, Summit.

References

External links
 US-Counties.com
 City-Data.com

Townships in Adams County, Iowa
Townships in Iowa